Isotheca is a monotypic genus of flowering plants belonging to the family Acanthaceae. The only species is Isotheca alba.

Its native range is Northern Trinidad.

References

Acanthaceae
Acanthaceae genera
Monotypic Lamiales genera